National Road 7 (also known as Riia-Pihkva maantee; Riga-Pskov highway) begins from Murati. The portion of the Riga-Pskov highway that passes through Estonia is short, with just 21.4 km of length in it. The highway ends on the Estonian and Russian border crossing at Luhamaa.

Route
The road is a part of the European route E77.

See also
 Transport in Estonia

References

External links

N7